Megacephala denticollis is a species of tiger beetle in the subfamily Cicindelinae that was described by Chaudoir in 1843.

References

denticollis
Beetles described in 1843